Felix Becker (born 9 August 1964) is a German fencer. He competed in the individual and team sabre events at the 1988, 1992 and 1996 Summer Olympics.

In 1994, he won the Fencing World Championships in Individual Men's Sabre.

References

External links
 

1964 births
Living people
German male fencers
Olympic fencers of West Germany
Olympic fencers of Germany
Fencers at the 1988 Summer Olympics
Fencers at the 1992 Summer Olympics
Fencers at the 1996 Summer Olympics
Sportspeople from Darmstadt
20th-century German people